Touila is a settlement in the Sahara Desert of south-west Algeria on the border with Mauritania.

Populated places in Tindouf Province

References